Ersnäs is a locality situated in Luleå Municipality, Norrbotten County, Sweden with 292 inhabitants in 2010. It is home to Ersnäs IF.

References

External links

Populated places in Luleå Municipality
Norrbotten